Daniel Bruce (born 13 May 1996) is an English footballer who plays as a midfielder for New Mexico United in the USL Championship.

College
Bruce played four years of college soccer at the University of North Carolina at Charlotte between 2015 and 2018, as well as spending 2014 as a redshirt.

Professional
On 27 February 2019, Bruce signed for USL Championship side New Mexico United ahead of their inaugural season.

Career statistics

Club

References

External links
Charlotte 49ers profile
USL profile

1996 births
Living people
Charlotte 49ers men's soccer players
New Mexico United players
USL Championship players
English footballers
English expatriate footballers
Association football midfielders